Cyperus sulcinux is a sedge of the family Cyperaceae that is native to Australia.

In Western Australia it is found around seepages in a small area to the north of the Kimberley region where it grows in sandy soils over sandstone.

See also
List of Cyperus species

References

Plants described in 1884
Flora of Western Australia
sulcinux